Gryazovets–Vyborg gas pipeline is a branch pipeline of the Northern Lights pipeline from Gryazovets in central part of Russian Federation through Vologda and Leningrad oblasts to Saint Petersburg, Vyborg, and Finland.  The third line of this pipeline was built to feed the Nord Stream 1 pipeline.

Status
Gryazovets–Vyborg gas pipeline is a part of the Russian unified gas transportation system. The third line connects the grid in Gryazovets with the Portovaya coastal compressor station near Vyborg.  It runs in parallel with other two lines of the Northern Lights pipeline.  The pipeline is designed, constructed, and operated solely by Gazprom. It feeds the Nord Stream gas pipeline as also supplies gas to the Northwestern region of Russia (Saint Petersburg and Leningrad Oblast), as well as a liquefied natural gas terminal in Portovaya that started in September 2022 for shipping to Kaliningrad.

Technical features
The Portovaya compressor station on the Russian coast of the Baltic Sea in the Portovaya Bay near Vyborg has been called "unique" because of its planned capacity and working pressure.

Construction
Construction of the third line of the Gryazovets–Vyborg gas pipeline began on 9 December 2005 in the town of Babayevo (Vologda Oblast), and it was completed in 2010.

See also

 South Stream

References

Natural gas pipelines in Russia
Gazprom pipelines